The New York State Department of Health (NYSDOH) is the department of the New York state government responsible for public health.. "There shall continue to be in the state government a department of health. The head of the department shall be the commissioner of health of the state of New York.""Commissioner biography"</ref> Its regulations are compiled in title 10 of the New York Codes, Rules and Regulations.

Public health infrastructure 
The CDC describes the public health infrastructure as three components: workforce capacity and competency: the recruitment, continuing education, and retention of health professionals; organizational capacity: the consortium of public health agencies and laboratories, working with private and nonprofit organizations; and information and data systems: the up-to-date guidelines, recommendations and health alerts, and the information and systems that monitor disease and enable efficient communication.

New York relies on a county-based system for delivery of public health services. NYSDOH promotes the prevention and disease control, environmental health, healthy lifestyles, and emergency preparedness and response; supervises local health boards; oversees reporting and vital records; conducts surveillance of hospitals; does research at the Wadsworth Center; and administers several other health insurance programs and institutions. 58 local health departments offer core services including assessing community health, disease control and prevention, family health, and health education; 37 localities provide environmental health services, while the other 21 rely on NYSDOH.

At the local level, public health workers are found not only in local health agencies but also in private and nonprofit organizations concerned with the public's health. The most common professional disciplines are physicians, nurses, environmental specialists, laboratorians, health educators, disease investigators, outreach workers, and managers, but also includes allied health professions. Nurses represented 22% of the localities' workforce (and 42% of full-time equivalent workers in rural localities), scientific/investigative staff represented 22%–27% of the workforce, support staff represented 28%, education/outreach staff represented 10%, and physicians represented 1%. In 2018 the NYSDOH had over 3300 personnel in its central office, three regional offices, three field offices and nine district health offices, and an additional 1400 personnel in its five healthcare institutions.

History

The earliest New York state laws regarding public health were quarantine laws for the port of New York, first passed by the New York General Assembly in 1758. The 1793 Philadelphia yellow fever epidemic precipitated the 1799–1800 creation of the New York Marine Hospital, and in 1801 its resident physician and the health officers of the port were constituted as the New York City board of health. The 1826–1837 cholera pandemic precipitated further legislation. In 1847 a law mandated civil registration of vital events (births, marriages, and deaths). In 1866, the state legislature passed the Metropolitan Health Law and established the NYC Metropolitan Board of Health, and in 1870 the legislature replaced it with the NYC Department of Health.

The State Board of Health was created 18 May 1880 by the 103rd Legislature. The 1881–1896 cholera pandemic further caused an expansion of its powers to compel reporting and to perform the duties of local boards of health. The State Department of Health and its commissioner were created by an act of 19 February 1901 of the 124th Legislature, superseding the board.

List of commissioners

See also
 New York State Department of Mental Hygiene
 New York City Department of Health and Mental Hygiene
 Wadsworth Center, the research-intensive public health laboratory of the New York State Department of Health
 Healthcare in New York

References

External links
 
 Department of Health in the New York Codes, Rules and Regulations
 Department of Health in Open NY (https://data.ny.gov/)
 New York State Department of Health recipient profile on USAspending.gov
 Department of Health contracts on Open Book New York from the New York State Department of Audit and Control

 
Health
State departments of health of the United States
1901 establishments in New York (state)
Government agencies established in 1901
Health departments in the United States